The University of Rijeka is in the city of Rijeka, Croatia, with faculties in cities throughout the regions of Primorje, Istria and Lika.

The University of Rijeka is composed of eleven faculties, one art academy, two departments, university libraries and the Student Centre Rijeka (SCRI).

History

While the modern university was founded on May 17, 1973, the first school of higher education was established in 1627 by the Jesuits and enjoyed equal status with the academies in the largest cities of the Austrian Empire. The Faculty of Philosophy, established in 1726, operated for two years. The Theological Faculty was founded in 1728. From 1773 to 1780, Rijeka was the seat of the Royal Academy. The modern day university was established during 1970's, a decade of exponential rise in number of higher education institutions in the former Yugoslavia when alongside Rijeka universities in Osijek, Kragujevac, Split, Mostar, Podgorica, Bitola, Maribor, Banja Luka and Tuzla all opened their doors.

The departments of biotechnology, informatics, mathematics and physics were founded in 2008. 
In 2022 the Department of Mathematics and the Department of Informatics became faculties.

Administration
These are the eleven faculties, one academy and two departments into which the university is divided:

Faculties and academies
 Academy of Applied Arts
 Faculty of Civil Engineering
 Faculty of Economics
 Faculty of Engineering
 Faculty of Humanities and Social Sciences (Faculty of Philosophy)
Department of Philosophy 
 Faculty of Law
 Faculty of Maritime Studies
 Faculty of Medicine
 Faculty of Teacher Education
 Faculty of Tourism and Hospitality Management (based in Opatija)

Faculty of Informatics
Since the implementation of the Bologna process in the academic year 2005/06, the Faculty of Informatics offers two undergraduate programmes (three years):

 Informatics
 Informatics in combination with another subject offered at Faculty of Arts and Sciences

Students finish with the title Bachelor of Science in Informatics. Both programmes introduce the foundations of programming, algorithms, data structures, digital electronics, computer architecture, computer networks, operating systems, databases, information systems, formal languages and automata theory, software engineering, logic programming, web engineering, multimedia and information theory.

After receiving the B.Sc. degree, the student can apply for the Master's degree in four programmes (two years):

 Information and communication systems,
 Business informatics,
 Informatics education,
 Informatics education in combination with another subject education offered at Faculty of Arts and Sciences

which ends with the title Master of Science (M.Sc.) in Informatics or Master of Education (M.Ed.) in Informatics.

In 2012, University of Rijeka Department of Informatics became Nvidia CUDA Teaching Center.

Faculty of Mathematics
Since the implementation of the Bologna process in the academic year 2005/06, the Faculty of Mathematics offers and undergraduate program (three years) in Mathematics, which finishes with the title Bachelor of Science in Mathematics. Courses include standard topics in mathematical analysis, linear algebra, numerical mathematics,  combinatorics graph theory, affine spaces and particularly Euclidean spaces, metric spaces, topology, set theory, geometry, number theory, mathematical logic, probability and statistics, mathematical modelling, programming, algorithms, information systems and computer architecture.

After receiving the B.Sc. degree, the student can apply for the Master's degree in two programmes (two years):

 Mathematics education,
 Mathematics and Informatics education, together with Department of Informatics.

In 2010, Department of Mathematics organized a conference on Information Security and Related Combinatorics under NATO Science for Peace and Security programme.

Departments
On April 1, 2008, University of Rijeka decided to make the Faculty of Arts and Sciences, departments of Informatics, Mathematics and Physics into independent departments.

 Department of Biotechnology
 Department of Physics

Department of Biotechnology
The Department of Biotechnology was founded in 2008 and currently has over 60 members of staff. It is located in the Departments building of the university campus at Trsat. The department offers one undergraduate degree program "Biotechnology and Drug Research", 3 masters programs "Drug Research and Development", "Biotechnology in Medicine" and "Medical Chemistry", 1 masters program in English "Biotechnology for the life sciences" and one doctoral program "Medical Chemistry". Further information can be found on their website.

Centers

Center for Iconographic Studies
The Center for Iconographic Studies (CIS) is a research center in the Faculty of Humanities and Social Sciences. CIS was founded with the idea of promoting iconography and iconology, as academic disciplines, and to establish a platform for academics from different disciplines to research the interpretation of visual arts. The Center organizes the annual conference of iconographic studies, as well as lectures, workshops and symposia, international networking and research projects, and it is involved in doctoral programs. CIS also publishes IKON - the journal of the iconographic studies.

The Department of Art History at the University of Rijeka in collaboration with the Department of Theology at the University of Zagreb organized the first conference of iconographic studies in 2007, and thus conceived the idea of establishing the center that is intended to become the platform for academics from different disciplines in researching the interpretation of visual arts. In 2008 the proceedings of the 2007 conference were published, and both conference and the journal continue to be organized annually. In 2011 CIS organized Art History Day in Rijeka, which has become an annual event for the region, especially oriented towards students and younger people. PURITEKA, an e-journal for students' articles has also been published. Since 2010, CIS has been a partner to a European project in culture: "Francia media – Cradles of European Culture".

The Center for Advanced Studies of Southeastern Europe (CAS – SEE) "is an organizational unit of the University of Rijeka specialized in the social sciences and humanities. Designed as a regional hub for high-level academic research, the Center aims to stimulate public discourses on topics with high societal relevance for the region and Europe. The vision of the Center is to promote freedom of research and to ensure the necessary prerequisites for innovative, intellectual and scientific development. The Center strives to strengthen the transnational and regional scientific cooperation on a range of socially pressing issues with relevance for the Humanistic and Social Sciences."

Rectors
Heads of the university hold the title of Rector (Rektor) and are elected to four-year terms. There have been 13 rectors since the university's establishment in 1973.

Source: List of rectors at the University of Rijeka website.

Student projects
Students at University of Rijeka work on various fields, and majority of projects are founded by Student council of Uniri.

Biggest examples are Onetius, Student Day Festival, Riteh Racing Team, NeuRi and Debate League of Rijeka.

International rankings 

The university not ranked by QS, ranking 1066 by USN, and 1329 by CWUR. It is not listed for THE.

See also
List of institutions of higher education in Croatia

References

External links
 University of Rijeka Website 
  Facultet za matematiku Sveučilišta u Rijeci
  Fakultet Informatike i Digitalnih Tehnologija Sveučilišta u Rijeci
  OpenClass homepage at HULK-Ri
  Odjel za Biotehnologiju Sveučilišta u Rijeci
  Department of Biotechnology, University of Rijeka

 
Educational institutions established in 1973
1973 establishments in Croatia
Rijeka
Organizations based in Rijeka